UV excision repair protein RAD23 homolog A is a protein that in humans is encoded by the RAD23A gene.

Function 

The protein encoded by this gene is one of two human homologs of Saccharomyces cerevisiae Rad23, a protein involved in nucleotide excision repair (NER). This protein was shown to interact with, and elevate the nucleotide excision activity of 3-methyladenine-DNA glycosylase (MPG), which suggested a role in DNA damage recognition in base excision repair. This protein contains an N-terminal ubiquitin-like domain, which was reported to interact with 26S proteasome, as well as with ubiquitin protein ligase E6AP, and thus suggests that this protein may be involved in the ubiquitin mediated proteolytic pathway in cells.

Interactions 

RAD23A has been shown to interact with:
 Ataxin 3,
 PSMD4,  and
 Sequestosome 1.

References

Further reading

External links

Human proteins